Karakyure is a rural locality (a selo) in Dokuzparinsky District, Republic of Dagestan, Russia. The population was 1,209 as of 2010. There are 6 streets.

Geography 
Karakyure is located 8 km east of Usukhchay (the district's administrative centre) by road. Novoye Karakyure and Usukhchay are the nearest rural localities.

Nationalities 
Lezgins live there.

References 

Rural localities in Dokuzparinsky District